Bungalow is a 2002 German film directed by  and starring Lennie Burmeister, Trine Dyrholm, Devid Striesow, and Nicole Gläser.

Plot 
Paul is a German soldier who goes AWOL when the truck he is riding in stops at a fast food restaurant. He then returns home to where his older brother Max lives. Paul is immediately attracted to Max's girlfriend, Lene, and tries to entice her into a sexual relationship, but she refuses. Paul is shown to be angry and loses his temper at those around him, including his brother, his old friend, and his ex-girlfriend.

The military soon begins to look for him. After they arrive at his house, Paul runs to a nearby motel. Lene visits him, and they have sex in his motel room. Two military officers, along with Max, track him down at the motel, but Paul disappears.

Background 
The film was produced in June/July 2001 in Gladenbach and Bad Endbach in Hesse.

Cast 
 Lennie Burmeister as Paul
 Trine Dyrholm as Lene
 Devid Striesow as Max
 Nicole Gläser as Kerstin

External links 
 
 
 

2002 films
2002 drama films
German drama films
2000s German-language films
2000s English-language films
2000s Danish-language films
2002 multilingual films
German multilingual films
2000s German films